The 113th Pennsylvania House of Representatives District is located in Lackawanna County and includes the following areas:

 Clarks Green
 Scranton (PART)
 Ward 01
 Ward 02
 Ward 03
 Ward 04
 Ward 05
 Ward 06
 Ward 07
 Ward 13
 Ward 14
 Ward 15
 Ward 16
 Ward 19 [PART, Divisions 03 and 04]
 Ward 20
 Ward 21
 Ward 22
 Ward 23
 Ward 24
 South Abington Township

Representatives

References

Government of Lackawanna County, Pennsylvania
113